is a Japanese shōjo manga series written and illustrated by Matsuri Hino. The series centers on the relationship between university student Megumi Kuroishi and heiress Suzuka Kogami and the curse that has bonded their respective families together for the past 100 generations. The series was originally serialized in Japan between 1999-2002 and published in the form of 5 tankōbon volumes. It was published in North America starting in 2008. In 2009, the series was listed among the top 10 shōjo properties.

Plot
The Kuroishi and Kogami families have a strange bond: for one hundred generations, the Kuroishi clan is compelled to serve the Kogami clan with their very mind, body and soul. Fourteen years ago, the entire Kogami family mysteriously disappeared. The head butler, Yoshimi, and his son Megumi reside in the Kogami house, living a life of wealth, riches, and luxury. Megumi, in particular, is happily enjoying his easy life, until one member of the family is discovered alive and well in China. Megumi is determined to refuse to serve his new mistress Suzuka when he returns, but he quickly learns that the compulsion to serve is not one he can ignore; it is a full dark and evil curse. When they first meet, he finds himself kneeling before her and warmly kissing her hand to welcome her home then proceeding to carry her into the house. Though he tries to fight it, he soon realizes that he is not able to.

As the series progresses, true and deeply close friendship blossoms into strong and genuinely close romance between Suzuka and Megumi as they learn more about the curse. Suzuka is no happier with Megumi having to suffer the curse and together they try to find a way to break it so that they can live their lives together happily forever after.

Characters
  is a 20-year-old Japanese university student who loved to live a carefree life inside the Kogami Mansion until one day, one of the missing Kogami family members, Suzuka, returns from China and enters his life. He is under a curse of the Kogami's Dragon  cast 100 generations ago. Every time Megumi looks into Suzuka's eyes he is taken over by the curse of the dragon, and becomes a doting, adoring, overprotective, servant to his "princess". Initially Megumi was very greedy and wanted the family dead so he could continue to live an easy life. He is horrified that he must be a servant and tries at first to simply leave however he is unable to. In time he begins to genuinely care for Suzuka and is able to act more like himself even when influenced by the curse which can be resisted to some extent if he avoids eye contact.
 , the sole heir to the Kogami fortune is seventeen years old. She was three years old when her parents took her to China and never came back. The people who set out to find them claimed the family was dead, but then fourteen years later someone found Suzuka living in a Chinese restaurant. She returns to Japan to meet Megumi, again. As she was being tutored by Megumi on learning how to speak Japanese, he writes in Japanese/Chinese kanji to tell her the reason for his mood swings.
  is the head butler to the Kogamis' and confidante and friend to Suzuka's late parents'. Yoshimi can be tough and strict, but he truly cares about his family and desires to meet their needs.
  is Megumi's mother who works for the police, primarily on cases involving stolen children who are sold on the black market.
 is Megumi's best friend and fellow university student. She was defined boy as birth, but she's a transgender girl.
  is a wealthy 16-year-old boy who comes to the Kogami mansion to propose to Suzuka. She rejects his offer, realizing she has deeper feelings for Megumi than she had originally thought.
 Rui Sakurayama is a maid to the Kogami family. She often follows her mother around to assist. She makes her first appearance in Volume 3. She is in love with Megumi, who rejected her for Suzuka. It is shown in a flashback that Megumi treated her as a substitute for Suzuka, when he heard of the Kogami family's death (with the exception being Suzuka). She comes back to the Kogami mansion, thinking that Megumi will marry her, and got into a fight with Suzuka over Megumi.

Media

Manga
It was originally serialized in LaLa from 1999 until 2002. The individual chapters were collected and published in five tankōbon volumes by Hakusensha. The series is licensed for English language release in North American by Viz Media and in Australia and New Zealand by Madman Entertainment.  It is licensed in Germany by Carlsen Verlag, Italy by JPOP Edizioni and in Brazil by Panini Comics.

Original volumes
  published on November 5, 1999
  published on August 5, 2000
  published on February 5, 2001
  published on October 5, 2001
  published on April 5, 2002

North American volumes published by Viz Media
  published on November 4, 2008
  published on January 6, 2009
  published in March 2009
  published in May 2009

Drama CD
 Released on November 21, 2001,

However, news suggests that a New Drama CD With improved audio will be released in 2018

Reception
Leroy Douresseaux of the Comic Book Bin said of the first volume, "It's the comedy that carries this somewhat ordinary teenage shoujo romance." On the later volumes, he claims that he originally didn't have much hope for the series because of its premise, but that Hino deals with it well by focusing not so much on the curse, but on the characters. He also says that, "the mixture of intriguing supporting characters and the narrative forays into the past (which often feature the adorable child versions of Megumi and Suzuka) give Captive Hearts its own distinctive tang".

The series was listed as being the 7th best-selling shōjo series, as well as the 20th over-all manga series, in America for the first quarter 2009.

References

Further reading

External links

1999 manga
Hakusensha manga
Romance anime and manga
Madman Entertainment manga
Shōjo manga
Viz Media manga